Tabernaemontana letestui is a species of plant in the family Apocynaceae. It is found in West Congo and Gabon.

References

letestui